The Garden of Allah was a famous hotel in West Hollywood, California (then an unincorporated area of Los Angeles which was usually considered a part of Hollywood), at 8152 Sunset Boulevard between Crescent Heights and Havenhurst, at the east end of the Sunset Strip.

Originally a  estate called Hayvenhurst, it was built in 1913 as the private residence of real estate developer William H. Hay. Alla Nazimova acquired the property in 1919: she converted it into a residential hotel in 1926 by adding 25 villas around the residence, which opened as the "Garden of Alla Hotel" in January 1927. In 1930, new owners renamed it the "Garden of Allah Hotel" (adding an 'h'). The property operated under a succession of owners for three decades until the last, Bart Lytton, owner of Lytton Savings & Loan, demolished the hotel in 1959 and replaced it with his bank's main branch.

History

Hayvenhurst 

The estate that later became the Garden of Allah Hotel was built in 1913 by real estate developer William H. Hay in the northwest corner of the Crescent Heights neighborhood, a  tract bounded by Sunset Boulevard on the north, Santa Monica Boulevard on the south, Crescent Avenue (later renamed Fairfax Avenue) on the east and Sweetzer Avenue on the west, which Hay had subdivided and developed starting in 1905.

The estate's original address was 8080 Sunset Boulevard but was later changed to 8152. It occupied a  lot that fronted Sunset Boulevard and was bounded by Crescent Heights Boulevard on the east and Hayvenhurst (now spelled Havenhurst) Drive on the west. The property's southern boundary was also the border between the Hollywood district of the city of Los Angeles and the then-unincorporated area that later became the city of West Hollywood.

Hay and his current wife Katherine personally supervised construction of the estate. The house had twelve rooms and four bathrooms. The finishes were all in Circassian walnut that the Hays had collected on a trip to the Philippines in 1912. The interior walls were covered in canvas and hand-painted. The garage had bays for two cars—a rarity in those days—with rooms upstairs for live-in servants. Construction and landscaping cost an estimated $30,000.

The Hays' stay at Hayvenhurst was short-lived. Within a few years they had built and moved into a new house a few blocks east, at 7920 Sunset Boulevard, the site today of the Directors Guild of America headquarters. William Hay also purchased Encino Ranch, a large tract of land in the San Fernando Valley that he would later develop into the upscale Encino neighborhood of Los Angeles. Hayvenhurst reportedly stood unoccupied for several years.

Garden of Alla 

Stage and screen actress Alla Nazimova leased Hayvenhurst from William Hay not long after she moved to Los Angeles from New York in 1918. She purchased it outright in 1919. Nazimova jokingly called her new home "The Garden of Alla", which was a reference to her own name and the best-selling 1904 novel The Garden of Allah, by British author Robert S. Hichens.

Faced with a financial crisis in the mid-1920s after her screen career derailed, Nazimova put her property to work generating an income by building a complex of 25 rental "villas" around the original house. The opening party for "The Garden of Alla Hotel" was held on January 9, 1927. She found her role as a hotel manager unsuitable and discovered that her unscrupulous partners in the enterprise had nearly bankrupted her, so in 1928 she sold out her remaining interest in the property, auctioned off most of her furniture and other household goods, and went back to the Broadway stage. By 1930, the owners had normalized the spelling in the hotel's name to "Allah".

After Nazimova's renewed Broadway success was cut short by illness in 1938, she returned to Hollywood and rented Villa 24, where she lived until her death in 1945.

Garden of Allah Hotel 
Catering to both short-term and long-term guests, the hotel soon gained a reputation as a place where the famous could enjoy living in a quaint, cozy, village-like setting, conveniently located yet shielded from gawking tourists and autograph seekers by discreet security patrols, under a management that was not inclined to probe, judge or interfere with the private — and sometimes public — activities of its often unconventional patrons.

The Garden of Allah became home to many celebrities and literary figures. F. Scott Fitzgerald lived there for several months in 1937–38 at the beginning of his final stay in Hollywood. He wrote himself a postcard while there: "Dear Scott — How are you? Have been meaning to come in and see you. I have living [sic] at the Garden of Allah. Yours, Scott Fitzgerald." Fitzgerald's biographer and lover Sheilah Graham later wrote a book about the place, titled simply The Garden of Allah.

Humorist and actor Robert Benchley was a frequent resident. An array of Golden Age Hollywood stars and featured players, ranging from Greta Garbo to Ronald Reagan, stayed there at least briefly, and so did classical music giants Sergei Rachmaninoff (who was musically assaulted there by an annoyed Harpo Marx), Igor Stravinsky and Jascha Heifetz. Humphrey Bogart lived in villa 8, where Errol Flynn stayed when Bogart was out of town. Gloria Stuart and Arthur Sheekman lived at villa 12. Dance band leaders Benny Goodman and Artie Shaw and vocalist Frank Sinatra were among the pop music personalities. Kay Thompson, then designing musical numbers for Judy Garland and her own nightclub act with The Williams Brothers, lived there; Thompson later wrote about a little girl who also lived in a hotel, Eloise.

Purchase by Lytton Savings 

Although celebrities such as Errol Flynn were still calling it home as late as 1957, by that time the hotel's architectural style was long out of fashion and its environs had become more tacky than glamorous. Land values were rising, historic preservation was still an eccentric notion, and "redevelopment" was a popular civic buzzword.

On April 11, 1959, Bart Lytton, president of Lytton Savings and Loan, announced that he had purchased the Garden of Allah Hotel from Beatrice Rosenus and Morris Markowitz for $755,000. Lytton's plans for the property included razing the hotel to make way for a new main branch for his bank, which had formerly been headquartered in the Canoga Park neighborhood in the San Fernando Valley.

On August 22, 1959, Lytton hosted a farewell party on the grounds of the hotel. Among the attendees was silent film star Francis X. Bushman, who had been at the opening party in 1927. Some other guests came costumed as old-time stars. In a nod to the hotel's creator, Nazimova's experimental 1923 silent film Salomé was shown on a large poolside screen. On August 30, an on-site public auction liquidated all the furnishings, fixtures and equipment, along with odds and ends valuable only as souvenirs. Demolition permits were issued on November 2. Within days, all traces of the hotel were gone and construction of the bank building had begun.

Miniature model 

In 1960, the Garden of Allah reappeared on the site in the form of a detailed miniature model of the complex. For many years, this was on display outside Lytton's building, in a small plaza at the corner of Sunset and Crescent Heights, sheltered from the elements in a sort of shrine with a lofty domed pavilion. It was later moved indoors and eventually disappeared. It resurfaced in private hands in the early 2010s, architecturally intact and with its built-in miniature electric lighting system restored.

Source of the name 

The hotel's name was not a direct reference to Islam but rather to Nazimova's first name and the title of a 1905 novel, The Garden of Allah, by British writer Robert S. Hichens. The novel was adapted into a play first produced in London in 1909. Mary Mannering acted in the play in 1910. The novel also served as the basis for three movies, the final one of which starred Marlene Dietrich, who was once a resident of the hotel.

Quotes about the Garden of Allah

Famous residents and guests 

A representative list of the Garden of Allah Hotel's famous guests:

 Lauren Bacall
 Tallulah Bankhead
 John Barrymore
 Donn Beach
 Lucius Beebe
 Robert Benchley
 Humphrey Bogart
 Clara Bow
 Louis Bromfield
 Louise Brooks
 Edgar Rice Burroughs
 Charles Butterworth
 Louis Calhern
 John Carradine
 Virginia Cherrill
 Mickey Cohen
 Buster Collier
 Ronald Colman
 Marc Connelly
 Gary Cooper
 Joan Crawford
 Jean Dalrymple
 Lili Damita
 Vic Damone
 Florence Desmond
 Marlene Dietrich
 F. Scott Fitzgerald
 Errol Flynn
 Greta Garbo
 Ava Gardner
 Dorothy Gish
 Jackie Gleason
 Jimmy Gleason
 Elinor Glyn
 Benny Goodman
 Frances Goodrich
 Ruth Gordon
 Sheilah Graham
 D.W. Griffith
 Albert Hackett
 Jon Hall
 Jed Harris
 Jascha Heifetz
 Lillian Hellman
 Ernest Hemingway
 Woody Herman
 Madeline Hurlock
 Garson Kanin
 George S. Kaufman
 Buster Keaton
 Muriel King
 Eartha Kitt
 Alexander Korda
 Elsa Lanchester
 Charles Laughton
 Frank Lawton
 Lila Lee
 John Loder
 Anita Louise
 Bessie Love
 Ernst Lubitsch
 Charles MacArthur
 Frances Marion
 Harpo Marx
 Zeppo Marx
 Groucho Marx
 Sam Marx
 Glesca Marshall
 Somerset Maugham
 Patty McCormack
 Ward Morehouse
 Nita Naldi
 Ramon Novarro
 Alla Nazimova
 David Niven
 John O'Hara
 Maureen O'Hara
 Walter O'Keefe
 Maureen O'Sullivan
 Clifford Odets
 Laurence Olivier
 Dorothy Parker
 Johnny Roselli
 S.J. Perelman
 Roland Petit
 Tyrone Power
 Sergei Rachmaninoff
 Ronald Reagan
 Flora Robson
 Ginger Rogers
 Harry Ruby
 Natalie Schafer
 Leon Shamroy
 Artie Shaw
 Mildred Shay
 Arthur Sheekman
 Robert E. Sherwood
 Frank Sinatra
 Red Skelton
 Everett Sloane
 Barbara Stanwyck
 John Steinbeck
 Donald Ogden Stewart
 Leopold Stokowski
 Igor Stravinsky
 Gloria Stuart
 Margaret Sullavan
 Kay Thompson
 Whitney Tower
 Forrest Tucker
 H.B. Warner
 Orson Welles
 Dame May Whitty
 Herbert Wilcox
 Hugh Williams
 Hope Williams
 John Hay "Jock" Whitney
 Alexander Woollcott
 Vincent Youmans

In popular culture 

 In 1956, just a few years before its demise, the Garden of Allah was one of the settings for Pamela Moore's novel Chocolates for Breakfast, the story of a teenage girl growing up with an actress mother.
 The Garden of Allah Hotel is mentioned in chapter 2 of the Ronald Reagan biography Killing Reagan by Bill O'Reilly. In the late 1940s it was where "Reagan reaches bottom when he wakes up one morning at the Garden of Allah Hotel on Sunset Boulevard and does not know the name of the woman lying next to him".
 The Mambo Kings (1992) used the location as a set in the film
 Herman Wouk called the Garden "Rainbow's End" in Youngblood Hawke, his novel about a successful writer who goes to Hollywood.
 It is apparently an urban legend that the bulldozing of the Garden of Allah in 1959 inspired the line in Joni Mitchell's song "Big Yellow Taxi", "They paved paradise and put up a parking lot". Indeed, Mitchell later lived in the Laurel Canyon neighborhood in the hills north of the site. However, in an interview in the early 1970s, Mitchell stated that the lyrics were inspired in 1970 by her first trip to Hawaii, where she was struck by a jarring juxtaposition of nature and modern civilization. Also, the next line after "They paved paradise and put up a parking lot" is "With a pink hotel, a boutique and a swinging hot spot", which does not reflect what happened to the Garden of Allah site itself, on which a bank building was erected. There was, however, also a large parking lot on the site to serve that building; the nearby Chateau Marmont hotel and at least one other big, pinkish and even nearer residential building overlooked it; boutiques abounded on the Sunset Strip; and the "swinging", politically hot Pandora's Box nightclub was directly across Crescent Heights in the 1960s. The existence of a secondary source of inspiration has apparently not been explicitly denied in Mitchell's published comments.
 A 1985 play Across from the Garden of Allah by Charles Wood starred Glenda Jackson and Nigel Hawthorn. It was a marital drama set in a hotel across the street from the Garden of Allah.
 The hotel is the setting for a series of historical novels by Martin Turnbull that began with The Garden on Sunset (2012).
 In the 2013 film Gangster Squad, a signboard reading "Garden of Allah" is seen outside the apartment in which Ryan Gosling's character resides, just before the scene in which he wakes up with Emma Stone.
 The location of the Garden of Allah, which is now a bank building, is prominently displayed in a comical scene from the 1987 movie Barfly starring Mickey Rourke.
 Former Eagles singer and drummer Don Henley released the 1995 song Garden of Allah in honor of the hotel.

References

External links 
 History of the Garden of Allah with photos
 The Vanished Garden of Carnal Abandon
 Time Magazine article on closing of Garden of Allah in 1959
 TCM Movie Morlocks article on the Garden of Allah 

West Hollywood, California
Defunct organizations based in Hollywood, Los Angeles
Demolished hotels in Los Angeles
Landmarks in Los Angeles
1927 establishments in California
1959 disestablishments in California
Hotels established in 1927
Buildings and structures demolished in 1959
Sunset Boulevard (Los Angeles)
Spanish Colonial Revival architecture in California